TAFE South Australia (TAFE SA) provides vocational education and training in South Australia. The acronym TAFE stands for Technical and Further Education and is used and recognised nationally throughout Australia.  TAFE SA is a Registered training organisation (RTO) under the jurisdiction of the Australian Skills Quality Authority (ASQA).

History
On 1 November 2012, TAFE SA became a statutory corporation separate from the Department of Further Education, Employment, Science and Technology.

2017 Training Scandal 
In December 2017, following a random audit of TAFE SA courses by the Australian Skills Quality Authority (ASQA), fourteen courses were affected for small discrepancies in assessment, affecting 630 students that were individually case managed. The Weatherill Government and Education Minister Susan Close announced that the government would cover expenses for affected students, but opposition and cross-bench figures have called for broader solutions such as a specialised Ombudsman or a statutory compensation scheme. This was taken up as a political issue by the Nick Xenophon Party. Close further sacked TAFE SA's chairman.  All assessment errors were rectified.

See also
 Education in Australia

References

External links
TAFE SA Website

South Australia, TAFE
Education in South Australia